Marvin Wilfred Feldman (December 20, 1915 – August 6, 2000) was a Major League Baseball player. Nicknamed "Coonie", Felderman played for Chicago Cubs in the 1942 season. He only played in three games in his one-year career, having one hit and four strike-outs in six at-bats with one walk. He also appeared in two games as a catcher where he maintained a fielding percentage of 1.000. Felderman was born in Bellevue, Iowa, and died in Riverside, California.

References

External links

Chicago Cubs players
1915 births
2000 deaths
Baseball players from Iowa
Nashville Vols players
Lenoir Red Sox players
Norfolk Elks players
Grand Rapids Jets players